The 2009 Torneo Descentralizado de Fútbol Profesional (known as the Copa Cable Mágico for sponsorship reasons) was the 93rd season of Association Peruvian football. A total of 16 teams competed in the tournament. The season began on February 14 and concluded on December 13 with the victory of Universitario de Deportes over Alianza Lima in the second leg of the final Play-off, giving Universitario its twenty-fifth Peruvian title.

Competitions modus
The season was divided into 3 stages. In the first stage the 16 teams played a round-robin home-and-away round for a total of 30 matches each. In the second stage the 16 teams were divided into 2 groups. The 8 teams that ranked an odd number played in the group Liguilla A and the 8 teams that ranked an even number played in Liguilla B. Each team carried on their records from the first stage. Each group played another round-robin home-and-away round for 14 matches played by each team. The teams ranked first in each group at the end of the 14 matches advanced to the third stage. The two teams with the worst fewest points at the end of the second stage were relegated. In the third stage the championship was contested in a two-legged Play-off. The Play-off finalists qualified for the Copa Libertadores. The remaining international competition berths were determined by the season aggregate table.

Changes from 2008

Structural changes
Two teams were added to the first division to make 16 teams in the first division from 14 in 2008.
The Apertura and Clausura tournament format was not used after the addition of the two teams to the first division.
Peru was given a third berth for the 2010 Copa Sudamericana.
In the Play-off finals, goal difference was removed as a tiebreaking criterion. A tie in points meant a third match at a neutral ground.

Promotion and relegation
Atlético Minero and Sport Boys finished the 2008 season in 13th and 14th place, respectively, in the aggregate table and thus were relegated to the Segunda División. They were replaced by the champion and runner-up teams of the 2008 Segunda División, Total Clean and Inti Gas and champion and runner-up teams of the 2008 Copa Perú, Sport Huancayo and CNI

Teams
A total of 16 teams competed in this season. The only teams to have ownership over their home ground is Alianza Lima and Universitario. The other 14 clubs rent their home grounds from the Instituto Peruano del Deporte or their local municipality.

First stage

Standings

Results

Second stage
The Second Stage began September 13. The winner of each Liguilla qualified for the 2010 Copa Libertadores group stage and advanced to the third stage of the Torneo Descentralizado.

Liguilla A

Standings

Results

Liguilla B

Standings

Results

Third stage
The Third Stage was the finals (also known as the Play-off) of the 2009 season between the winners of each group of the Second Stage. They were played on December 8 and 13. The group winner with the most points on the aggregate table chose the home ground order.

Aggregate table
The aggregate table determined the third Peruvian berth for the 2010 Copa Libertadores, the three berths for the 2010 Copa Sudamericana, and the relegation to the Segunda División. The aggregate table consists of the points earned in the First and Second stages.

Top goalscorers
23 goals
 Richard Estigarribia (Total Chalaco)
20 goals
 Héctor Hurtado (Sporting Cristal)
15 goals
 Sergio Ibarra (Juan Aurich)
14 goals
 Ysrael Zúñiga (Melgar)
 Roberto Demus (U. César Vallejo)
13 goals
 Mayer Candelo (Juan Aurich)
 Irven Ávila (Sport Huancayo)
 Blas López (Sport Huancayo)
12 goals
 Martín Arzuaga (U. San Martín)
 Gianfranco Labarthe (Universitario)

References

External links
Peru 2009 season at RSSSF
Peruvian Football League News 

Peruvian Primera División seasons
1